Little Black Bear 84 is an Indian reserve of the Little Black Bear First Nation in Saskatchewan. It is 19 kilometres east of Fort Qu'Appelle. In the 2016 Canadian Census, it recorded a population of 137 living in 34 of its 43 total private dwellings. In the same year, its Community Well-Being index was calculated at 51 of 100, compared to 58.4 for the average First Nations community and 77.5 for the average non-Indigenous community.

References

Indian reserves in Saskatchewan
Division No. 6, Saskatchewan
Little Black Bear First Nation